Aniara sepulcralis (often misspelled as sepulchralis) is a species of beetle in the family Cicindelidae, the only species in the genus Aniara.

Recent studies suggest that this species renders the genus Tetracha paraphyletic, and is likely to be included in that genus in the future.

References

External links
 

Cicindelidae
Beetles described in 1801